French legislative elections took place on 5 and 12 June 1988, to elect the ninth National Assembly of the Fifth Republic, one month after the re-election of François Mitterrand as President of France.

In 1986, the Socialist Party (PS) of President Mitterrand lost the legislative election. For the first time under the Fifth Republic, the President was forced to "cohabit" with a hostile parliamentary majority and cabinet. He chose the RPR leader Jacques Chirac as Prime Minister. The two heads of the executive power were rivals for the 1988 presidential election.

Inspired by the example of Ronald Reagan and Margaret Thatcher, Chirac campaigned on an aggressively right-wing set of policies (including privatizations, abolition of the solidarity tax on wealth and tightening restrictions on immigration) but he was faced with significant opposition in French society. For his part, Mitterrand presented himself as the protector of national unity. He campaigned for a "united France" and warned against "the appropriation of the state by a clan", targeting Chirac and the RPR. An alliance between the Socialists and the center-right UDF was evoked.

After Mitterrand's re-election, Chirac resigned. Some politicians and commentators suggested not dissolving the National Assembly and instead nominating a UDF Prime minister (Valéry Giscard d'Estaing or Simone Veil). President Mitterrand refused. The polls indicated a "pink surge" if new legislative elections were organized. However, he nominated the moderate Socialist Michel Rocard to lead the cabinet and declared that it was unhealthy for democracy if one party held all the power.

In spite of a very good result in the first round, the "Presidential Majority" (composed of the PS and the Left Radicals) obtained only a small parliamentary majority after the second round. The PS and its allies won 276 seats against 271 for the Republican right-wing coalition and 27 Communists. The re-establishment of the majoritarian two-ballot system resulted in the National Front, which had held 35 seats during the previous term, dropping to only one seat.

Some personalities from "civil society" and four UDF politicians participated in the government. They were supported by a minority of their party, which created a new parliamentary group: the Union of the Centre. The executive power relied on the "Presidential Majority" which widened towards the Union of the Centre or the French Communist Party depending on the policy being advocated by the government.

Results 

|-
! style="background-color:#E9E9E9;text-align:left;vertical-align:top;" rowspan=2 colspan=3 width=600 |Parties and coalitions
! style="background-color:#E9E9E9;text-align:center;" colspan=2 |1st round
! style="background-color:#E9E9E9;text-align:center;" colspan=2 |2nd round
! style="background-color:#E9E9E9" rowspan=2|Total seats
|-
! style="background-color:#E9E9E9;text-align:right;" |Votes
! style="background-color:#E9E9E9;text-align:right;" |%
! style="background-color:#E9E9E9;text-align:right;" |Votes
! style="background-color:#E9E9E9;text-align:right;" |%
|-
| style="background-color:#E75480;" |
| style="text-align:left;" | Socialist Party (Parti socialiste)
| style="text-align:right;" | PS
| style="text-align:right;" | 8,493,702
| style="text-align:right;" | 34.77
| style="text-align:right;" | 9,198,778
| style="text-align:right;" | 45.31
| style="text-align:right;" | 260
|-
| style="background-color:#FF0000;" |
| style="text-align:left;" | French Communist Party (Parti communiste français)
| style="text-align:right;" | PCF
| style="text-align:right;" | 2,765,761
| style="text-align:right;" | 11.32
| style="text-align:right;" | 695,569
| style="text-align:right;" | 3.43
| style="text-align:right;" | 27
|-
| style="background-color:#DA7B8B;" |
| style="text-align:left;" | Miscellaneous Left
| style="text-align:right;" | DVG
| style="text-align:right;" | 403,690
| style="text-align:right;" | 1.65
| style="text-align:right;" | 421,587
| style="text-align:right;" | 2.08
| style="text-align:right;" | 7
|-
| style="background-color:#FFBF00;" |
| style="text-align:left;" | Movement of Left Radicals (Mouvement des radicaux de gauche)
| style="text-align:right;" | MRG
| style="text-align:right;" | 272,316
| style="text-align:right;" | 1.11
| style="text-align:right;" | 260,104
| style="text-align:right;" | 1.28
| style="text-align:right;" | 9
|- style="background-color:pink"
| style="text-align:left;" colspan=2| Total Left ("Presidential Majority" and PCF)
|
| style="text-align:right;" | 11,935,469
| style="text-align:right;" | 48.85
| style="text-align:right;" | 10,576,038
| style="text-align:right;" | 52.10
| style="text-align:right;" | 303
|-
| style="background-color:#0000C8;" |
| style="text-align:left;" | Rally for the Republic (Rassemblement pour la République)
| style="text-align:right;" | RPR
| style="text-align:right;" | 4,687,047
| style="text-align:right;" | 19.19
| style="text-align:right;" | 4,688,493
| style="text-align:right;" | 23.09
| style="text-align:right;" | 126
|-
| style="background-color:#00CCCC;" |
| style="text-align:left;" | Union for French Democracy (Union pour la démocratie française)
| style="text-align:right;" | UDF
| style="text-align:right;" | 4,519,459
| style="text-align:right;" | 18.50
| style="text-align:right;" | 4,299,370
| style="text-align:right;" | 21.18
| style="text-align:right;" | 129
|-
| style="background-color:#4C4CB0;" |
| style="text-align:left;" | Miscellaneous Right
| style="text-align:right;" | DVD
| style="text-align:right;" | 697,272
| style="text-align:right;" | 2.85
| style="text-align:right;" | 522,970
| style="text-align:right;" | 2.58
| style="text-align:right;" | 16
|- style="background-color:lightblue"
| style="text-align:left;" colspan=2|Total "Union of the Rally and the Center" (Right)
|
| style="text-align:right;" | 9,903,778
| style="text-align:right;" | 40.54
| style="text-align:right;" | 9,510,833
| style="text-align:right;" | 46.85
| style="text-align:right;" | 271
|-
| style="background-color:#0D378A;" |
| style="text-align:left;" | National Front (Front national)
| style="text-align:right;" | FN
| style="text-align:right;" | 2,359,528
| style="text-align:right;" | 9.66
| style="text-align:right;" | 216,704
| style="text-align:right;" | 1.07
| style="text-align:right;" | 1
|-
| style="background-color:#C41E3A;" |
| style="text-align:left;" | Far-left
| style="text-align:right;" | EXG
| style="text-align:right;" | 89,065
| style="text-align:right;" | 0.36
| style="text-align:right;" | -
| style="text-align:right;" | -
| style="text-align:right;" | -
|-
| style="background-color:#77ff77;" |
| style="text-align:left;" | Ecologists
| style="text-align:right;" | ECO
| style="text-align:right;" | 86,312
| style="text-align:right;" | 0.35
| style="text-align:right;" | -
| style="text-align:right;" | -
| style="text-align:right;" | -
|-
| style="background-color:#80461B;" |
| style="text-align:left;" | Far-right
| style="text-align:right;" | EXD
| style="text-align:right;" | 32,445
| style="text-align:right;" | 0.13
| style="text-align:right;" | -
| style="text-align:right;" | -
| style="text-align:right;" | -
|-
| style="background-color:#dddd00;" |
| style="text-align:left;" | Regionalists
|
| style="text-align:right;" | 18,498
| style="text-align:right;" | 0.08
| style="text-align:right;" | -
| style="text-align:right;" | -
| style="text-align:right;" | -
|-
|
| style="text-align:left;" | Total
|
| style="text-align:right;" | 24,425,095
| style="text-align:right;" | 100.00
| style="text-align:right;" | 20,303,575
| style="text-align:right;" | 100.00
| style="text-align:right;" | 575
|-
| style="text-align:left;" colspan=6 | Abstention: 34.26% (1st round) 30.11% (2nd round). Note: Two seats vacant after the invalidation of two elections in the Oise département.
|}

Assembly by Parliamentary Group 

Notes: 
 2 vacant seats due to the cancellation of elections in the first and second constituencies of the Oise department.
 A Communist group (24 members + 1 caucusing) was created on 15 July 1988 following the lowering of the threshold to form a group from 30 to 20.

1988
1988 elections in France
June 1988 events in Europe